Ribbhu Mehra is an Indian television actor, model and DJ. He is known for his portrayal of Nikhil on Yeh Hai Mohabbatein, and Arjun Rathod on My Name Ijj Lakhan.

Early life
In his early life, Mehra studied at Vishwa Bharati Public School. He later studied accounting at the Institute of Chartered Accountants of India and graduated from Shaheed Bhagat Singh College completing his B.com (Hons). His family consists of his parents, Rakesh and Meenu Mehra, and older sister Ruchi Sharma who is married.

Career
In 2009, he started his career as a DJ. Later in 2015, he had a very short role in Ki and Ka opposite Kareena Kapoor. In the same year, he appeared in a Bangur Cements commercial and made his on screen television debut in a show called "Rakkt" as Akbar which aired on Epic (TV channel). A year later, he starred in two other commercials, Flamingo Tvc and for online e-commerce portal Fynd. His advertisement titled "Kahan se liya" for Fynd also got listed under Top 10 YouTube Ads in India (January, 2017). In the same year he appeared in an episode of 24 (Indian TV series season 2) playing an ATU Agent. In early 2017, he starred on Savdhaan India as Arjan. A month later in July, he debuted as Nikhil on Star Plus soap opera Yeh Hai Mohabbatein. Two months later, he promoted Farah Khan's 'Lip Sing Battle' with his Ye Hai Mohabbatein co-star Aditi Bhatia. He then appeared in a TV commercial opposite actress Malaika Arora. End of the year for the New Year's Eve he DJed in Goa resort. In 2018, he appeared in the music video of singer Altaf Sayeed titled "Re Piya". In August, he appeared in another episode of Zing Channel's "Aye Zindagi" as a lead.

In 2019, he booked a new show on SAB TV's sitcom My Name Ijj Lakhan, as  Arjun Rathod. In the same year he booked his second show with Balaji Telefilms Kumkum Bhagya as Ritik, Disha's love interest  and web series XXX season 2 with ALTBalaji. In 2020, he starred on a film Faactory. In 2022, he joined the cast of Star Bharat's "Bohot Pyaar Karte Hain".

Personal life
Ribbhu is engaged to actress Kirtida Mistry.

Filmography

Television and Films

web series

Music videos

References

External links 

 

Indian DJs
Indian male television actors
Indian male models
Indian male soap opera actors
Living people
Year of birth missing (living people)